Henry Edward Jane (8 August 1890 – 23 March 1933) was an Australian rules footballer who played with Carlton and St Kilda in the Victorian Football League (VFL).

Death
He died on 23 March 1933.

Notes

External links 

Henry Jane's profile at Blueseum

1890 births
1933 deaths
Carlton Football Club players
St Kilda Football Club players
Kalgoorlie City Football Club players
Australian rules footballers from Western Australia